Charlotte Milchard (born 13 December 1977) is a British actress.

Early life
Milchard was born in Barking, London but spent the early years of her childhood living in Asia when her father's work as a scientist led the family to travelling the majority of the world. She graduated from the Italia Conti Academy of Theatre Arts in 2000.

Career
Milchard has received critical acclaim for her stage performances. She has also appeared in several films, most notably The Fourth Kind. Despite being poorly received by critics, the film was a moderate box office success, earning over US$47 million worldwide. Milchard also starred in Mindflesh, a film based on the novel White Light by William Scheinman. It won Best Horror at the Philadelphia Independent Film Festival, but failed to achieve a general release. 
In 2019, she won Best Supporting Actress at the National Film Awards for her role in the film Scott and Sid.

Filmography

Film

Television

Awards and nominations
Charlotte Milchard was the winner of Best Supporting Actress for her role in the feature film Scott and Sid at the National Film Awards UK 2019.

References

External links

Official site – Charlotte Milchard

1977 births
English film actresses
English stage actresses
Living people
People from Barking, London
Alumni of the Italia Conti Academy of Theatre Arts